George Minor Jr. (April 21, 1919 – April 1973) was an American Negro league outfielder in the 1940s.

Early life and career
A native of Henderson, Texas, Minor made his Negro leagues debut in 1944 with the Chicago American Giants. He went on to play three seasons with the Cleveland Buckeyes. Minor died in 1973 at age 53 or 54.

References

Further reading
 Fort Worth Star-Telegram (February 13, 1940). "What He Got Wasn't Religion—It Was 30 Days". Fort Worth Star-Telegram. p. 8
 Fort Worth Star-Telegram (November 14, 1941). "He Stole Watches, So He Gets Time".Fort Worth Star-Telegram. p. 8
 Journal-Herald staff (September 10, 1948). "Buckeyes Nip Giants, 3-0". The Dayton Journal Herald. p. 23
 Courier staff (March 26, 1949). "Negro Teams Drilling, Seek Talent to Sell Majors". The Pittsburgh Courier. p. 29
 Star-Telegram staff (February 27, 1959). "Baseball Player Gets Sentence". Fort Worth Star-Telegram. p. 8
 Star-Telegram staff (April 13, 1973). "Former Resident's Funeral Tomorrow". Fort Worth Star-Telegram. p. 84

External links
 and Seamheads

1919 births
1973 deaths
Place of death missing
Date of death missing
Chicago American Giants players
Cleveland Buckeyes players
Baseball outfielders
Baseball players from Texas
People from Henderson, Texas
Baptists from Texas
20th-century African-American sportspeople